Thomas Kingsmill may refer to:

 Thomas Kingsmill (professor) (fl. 1565), English academic, Regius Professor of Hebrew at Oxford from 1570
 Thomas Kingsmill (Hawkhurst Gang) (c. 1720–1749), leader of the notorious Hawkhurst Gang of smugglers
  (born 1994), New Zealand water polo player